Plastered human skulls are human skulls covered in layers of plaster, typically found in the ancient Levant, most notably around the modern Palestinian city of Jericho, between 8,000 and 6,000 BC (approximately 9000 years ago), in the Pre-Pottery Neolithic B period. They represent some of the oldest forms of art in the Middle East and demonstrate that the prehistoric population took great care in burying their ancestors below their homes. The skulls denote some of the earliest sculptural examples of portraiture in the history of art.

Discovery
One skull was accidentally unearthed in the 1930s by the archaeologist John Garstang at Jericho, in the West Bank. A number of plastered skulls from Jericho were discovered by the British archaeologist Kathleen Kenyon in the 1950s and can now be found in the collections of the British Museum, the Ashmolean Museum, the Cambridge Museum of Archaeology and Anthropology, the Royal Ontario Museum, the Nicholson Museum in Sydney and the Jordan Archaeological Museum.

Other sites where plastered skulls were excavated include Ain Ghazal near Amman, Jordan, and Tell Ramad in Syria. Most of the plastered skulls were from adult males, but some belonged to women and children.

Archaeological significance
The plastered skulls represent some of the earliest forms of burial practices in the southern Levant. During the Neolithic period, the deceased were often buried under the floors of their homes. Sometimes the skull was removed, and its cavities filled with plaster and painted. In order to create more lifelike faces, shells were inset for eyes, and paint was used to represent facial features, hair, and moustaches.

Some scholars believe that this burial practice represents an early form of ancestor worship, where the plastered skulls were used to commemorate and respect family ancestors. Other experts argue that the plastered skulls could be linked to the practice of head hunting, and used as trophies although there is scarce evidence to support this. Plastered skulls provide evidence about the earliest arts and religious practices in the ancient Near East.

Gallery

References

Further reading
D. Collon, Ancient Near Eastern art (London, The British Museum Press, 1995)
J.N. Tubb, Canaanites (London, The British Museum Press, 1998)
German, Senta. “The Neolithic Revolution.” Khana Academy.
Strouhal, E. Five Plastered Skulls from Pre-Pottery Neolithic B Jericho: Anthropological Study Paléorient 1:1-2 (1973): 231–247.

1930s archaeological discoveries
Neolithic
Archaeology of the Near East
Collections of the Royal Ontario Museum
Middle Eastern objects in the British Museum
Ancient Jericho
Neolithic settlements
Prehistoric art
Collection of the Ashmolean Museum
Pre-Pottery Neolithic B
Skulls in art